Geranium umbelliforme is a plant species native to central Sichuan and Yunnan, China at elevations of 2800–3200 meters.

References

External links
 
 

umbelliforme